Oliver's Story is a 1978 American romantic drama film and a sequel to Love Story (1970)  based on a novel by Erich Segal published a year earlier. It was directed by John Korty and again starred Ryan O'Neal, this time opposite Candice Bergen. The original music score was composed by Lee Holdridge and Francis Lai. It was released by Paramount Pictures on December 15, 1978.

This film's promotional tagline is: "It takes someone very special to help you forget someone very special."

Plot
Oliver Barrett IV is emotionally devastated by the death of his young wife, Jenny, who succumbed to leukemia. As he tries to lose himself in his work as a lawyer, the long hours do not ease his pain, especially when he finds that his views conflict with those of the senior partners at the firm.

Oliver's inconsolable grief begins to alienate those around him, at least until he finds new love with Marcie Bonwit, the wealthy and beautiful heiress to the Bonwit Teller fortune. Despite his affection for her, Oliver finds it difficult to leave the memory of Jenny behind, which causes many problems in their relationship, even as he concurrently begins a reconciliation with his autocratic father. Though Oliver and Marcie eventually part, Oliver and his father reconcile when both men discover surprising things they never knew about each other and Oliver finally joins Barrett Enterprises.

Cast
 Ryan O'Neal – Oliver Barrett IV
 Candice Bergen – Marcie Bonwit
 Nicola Pagett – Joanna Stone
 Ed Binns – Phil Cavilleri
 Benson Fong – John Hsiang
 Charles Haid – Stephen Simpson
 Kenneth McMillan – Jamie Francis
 Ray Milland – Oliver Barrett III
 Josef Sommer – Dr. Dienhart
 Sully Boyar – Mr. Gentilano
 Swoosie Kurtz – Gwen Simpson
 Meg Mundy – Mrs. Barrett
 Beatrice Winde – Waltereen

Production
Ryan O'Neal was offered a reported $3 million for his role. He originally turned it down, saying he was unhappy with the script. "It was just a rehash of the book, which hadn't interested me," he said. "I just don't think Segal did a good job of catching him. Oliver is a real hard guy to follow."

He changed his mind after  director John Korty rewrote the script. O'Neal says he was paid less than $3 million, although he received $1 million up front and a share of the profits.

O'Neal says that Candice Bergen was reluctant to appear in the film and he had to persuade her by giving her one of his points in the film.

John Marley did not reprise his role as Ali MacGraw's father from the original. He and Paramount had come to terms on money but not billing; he was replaced by Edward Binns.

In the original draft of the film, O'Neal's character was meant to end up with the one played by Nicola Pagett. However, on viewing the movie the filmmakers felt that it was not believable O'Neal would go with Pagett after being with the more beautiful Candice Bergen, so they removed these scenes from the movie.

Location
A number of scenes were filmed in Massachusetts. The Stanley Woolen Mill in Uxbridge, Massachusetts, and other locations in that community were used for this film. Oliver's law offices were those occupied at the time by the New York firm of Davis Polk & Wardwell. The Bonwit Teller store in Eastchester, N.Y. was also used as a shoot location. Filming also took place in New York City and Hong Kong.

Critical reception
Unlike the original film, Oliver's Story was poorly reviewed and was not successful at the box office. On Rotten Tomatoes the film has an approval rating of 29% based on reviews from 7 critics.

O'Neal thought a major reason behind the film's failure was the fact the character played by Nicola Pagett was cut out of the last third.

Soundtrack

Oliver's Story soundtrack was released on vinyl and cassette tape by ABC Records in December 1978.

Side 1:
 "Prologue" – Francis Lai (1:58)
 "Theme from Love Story" – Francis Lai (2:06)
 "Love Theme from Oliver's Story (Oliver's Theme)" – Francis Lai (2:12)
 "Night Drive to Cambridge" – Lee Holdridge (4:35)
 "Oliver's Childhood Room" – Lee Holdridge (1:25)
 "Love at the Red Apple (Oliver's Theme)" – Francis Lai (3:51)

Side 2:
 "Love Theme From Oliver's Story (Oliver's Theme)" – Francis Lai (3:02)
 "Hong Kong Park" – Lee Holdridge (0:53)
 "Tentative Feelings (Oliver's Theme)" – Francis Lai, Lee Holdridge (1:59)
 "Tennis, Jogging, and Singles Bars (Oliver's Theme)" – Francis Lai, Lee Holdridge (2:14)
 "Montage of Moments" – Francis Lai, Lee Holdridge (5:40)

References

External links 
 
 
 
 Erich Segal official website

1978 films
1978 romantic drama films
American romantic drama films
American sequel films
1970s English-language films
Films about widowhood
Films based on American novels
Films based on romance novels
Films directed by John Korty
Films scored by Lee Holdridge
Films shot in Massachusetts
Films shot in New York City
Films shot in Hong Kong
Paramount Pictures films
Sequel novels
Films scored by Francis Lai
1970s American films